Ersan is a Turkish given name for males. People named Ersan include:

 Ersan Dogu, Turkish footballer
Ersan Erdura, a Turkish singer
 Ersan Gülüm, Turkish footballer
 Ersan İlyasova, Turkish basketball player
 Ersan Keleş, Turkish-Belgian futsal player
Ersan Şen (born 1966), Turkish lawyer and academic

Turkish masculine given names